Nicolas Gillet (born 11 August 1976) is a French former professional footballer who played as a defender. In 2001, he earned a cap for France during the 2001 Confederations Cup against Australia.

Career
Whilst at FC Nantes Gillet contributed 27 appearances as his side won the 2000–01 Division 1. He also played in the victorious 1999 and 2000 Coupe de France finals, and the 2001 Trophée des Champions.

Honours
Nantes
Coupe de France: 1998–99, 1999–2000
Division 1: 2000–01
Trophée des Champions: 2001

Lens
UEFA Intertoto Cup: 2005

France
FIFA Confederations Cup: 2001

References

External links

1976 births
Living people
People from Brétigny-sur-Orge
Footballers from Essonne
Footballers from Brittany
French footballers
France international footballers
Association football defenders
FC Nantes players
RC Lens players
Le Havre AC players
Angers SCO players
Ligue 1 players
Ligue 2 players
2001 FIFA Confederations Cup players
FIFA Confederations Cup-winning players